Travon DaShawn Frank Smart (January 13, 1997 – June 18, 2018), better known by his stage name Jimmy Wopo, was an American rapper from Pittsburgh, Pennsylvania.

Wopo was an affiliate of fellow Pittsburgh-based rapper Wiz Khalifa and his Taylor Gang imprint. He made his first high-profile appearance with his 2016 breakout single, "Elm Street", produced by Stvii B, which Complex included in the "'Bout to Blow: 10 Dope New Songs You Should Be Hearing Everywhere Soon" list. Following that success, he collaborated with several prominent rappers including Wiz Khalifa, Sonny Digital, 21 Savage and more. After receiving a co-sign from hip hop producer Mike Will Made It, rap duo Rae Sremmurd brought Wopo out to perform during their set at the Pittsburgh stop of their SremmLife 2 Tour. Wopo was murdered in a drive-by shooting on June 18, 2018.

Career 
In January 2015, Wopo began uploading original tracks to his SoundCloud account. Taylor Maglin, the owner of the Pittsburgh-based blog Daily Loud, partnered with him and began to publicize his music. This additional push helped him to accumulate millions of views on his music videos on his YouTube channel. Joining the wave of Wopo's viral success, urban hip hop blog WorldStarHipHop exclusively debuted five of his music videos in 2016. On July 24, 2016, he premiered his debut project, Woponese, on Daily Loud. This 8-track mixtape included the single "Back Door", which features Sonny Digital. In October 2016, Riff Raff tapped Wopo for a feature on the track "Stay Away from You" on his Balloween mixtape. On November 25, 2016, he released a joint album with his fellow Pittsburgh-based rapper Hardo. This nine-track project featured ShadyHigler, 21 Savage and Wiz Khalifa.

As many as fifty completed, unreleased songs will be released posthumously, according to Wopo's manager.

Legal issues 
On February 7, 2016, Wopo was arrested during a traffic stop in Washington County, Pennsylvania. Police arrested Wopo and two others after finding two stamp bags of suspected heroin and a small amount of marijuana. He was arraigned on drug charges and drinking charges and placed in jail with a $25,000 bond. Later, while out, Wopo, landed in jail because of probation violation. Wopo failed to inform officials of his trip to New York State, where he was caught and imprisoned on such charges. While in jail, he wrote an album, Back Against the Wall, which he recorded the first day he got out of jail.

Death 
At 4:22 PM EDT on June 18, 2018, Smart and a male passenger were shot in Pittsburgh's Hill District neighborhood. The passenger survived, but Smart, who was shot in the head, died after being rushed to the UPMC Presbyterian at 5:56 PM. He was 21 years old, and left behind three children.

Discography 
Woponese (2016)
Trapnese (2016) (with Hardo)
Jordan Kobe (2017)
Back Against the Wall (2017)

References

External links 

1997 births
2018 deaths
2018 murders in the United States
Deaths by firearm in Pennsylvania
East Coast hip hop musicians
People murdered in Pennsylvania
Rappers from Pittsburgh
Songwriters from Pennsylvania
21st-century American rappers
Bloods
American murder victims